The gens Vatinia (sometimes spelled Vatiena and Vaciena) was a plebeian clan in ancient Rome. The best known member of the gens was Publius Vatinius who was the first to achieve the consulship in the late Republic.

Members
 Publius Vatienus, grandfather of the consul, he was from Reate and has been nicknamed by some sources "Reatinus"
 Vatiena, mistress of the poet Laevius
 Publius (P. f.) P. n. Vatinius, grandson of Reatinus and supporter of Julius Caesar, he became consul in 47 BC.
 Vatinia Primigenia, wife of a Quintus Poppaeus Sabinus of Pompeii.

See also
 List of Roman gentes

References

 
Roman gentes